"Wanted Man" is the first track on American heavy metal band Ratt's album Out of the Cellar. It was also featured on the soundtrack for the 1985 film Weird Science. The song was composed by Robbin Crosby, Stephen Pearcy, and Joey Cristofanilli (who was briefly filling in for full-time Ratt bassist Juan Croucier), and it was the second biggest hit on the album (note: "Back for More" did not qualify for a chart position since it was not an actual single release), reaching number 87 on the Billboard Hot 100 and 38 on the Billboard Mainstream Rock Tracks chart.

Music video 
The music video for the song is based on a wild west theme. In the video, the band members are a group of wanted men also known as "The Ratt Gang," the name being taken from a line in the song. The band members end up getting into a gun fight with another gang of cowboys who were also up to no good.

Track listing 
"Wanted Man" - 3:37
"She Wants Money" - 3:04

Personnel 
Stephen Pearcy- Vocals
Warren DeMartini- co-lead guitar
Robbin Crosby- co-lead guitar
Juan Croucier- Bass guitar
Bobby Blotzer- Drums

Charts

References

External links 

1984 singles
Ratt songs
Song recordings produced by Beau Hill
Songs written by Stephen Pearcy
Songs written by Robbin Crosby
Songs written by Joey Cristofanilli
1984 songs
Atlantic Records singles